Proprioseiopsis bregetovae is a species of mite in the family Phytoseiidae.

References

bregetovae
Articles created by Qbugbot
Animals described in 1970